Progress 37 was a Soviet uncrewed Progress cargo spacecraft, which was launched in July 1988 to resupply the Mir space station.

Launch
Progress 37 launched on 18 July 1988 from the Baikonur Cosmodrome in the Kazakh SSR. It used a Soyuz-U2 rocket.

Docking
Progress 37 docked with the aft port of the Kvant-1 module of Mir on 20 July 1988 at 22:33:40 UTC, and was undocked on 12 August 1988 at 08:31:54 UTC.

Decay
It remained in orbit until 12 August 1988, when it was deorbited. The deorbit burn occurred at 12:51:30 UTC and the mission ended at 13:45:40 UTC.

See also

 1988 in spaceflight
 List of Progress missions
 List of uncrewed spaceflights to Mir

References

Progress (spacecraft) missions
1988 in the Soviet Union
Spacecraft launched in 1988
Spacecraft which reentered in 1988
Spacecraft launched by Soyuz-U rockets